Valentin Vanbaleghem (born 9 October 1996) is a French professional footballer who plays as a midfielder for  club Sedan.

Career
Vanbaleghem is a youth product of Lille OSC, having joined their youth academy at the age of 6. He briefly played for Les Herbiers VF on loan before moving to LB Châteauroux in 2018.

He signed a two-years contract with Serie C club  Perugia in October 2020. Perugia advanced to Serie B for the 2021–22 season. On 24 January 2022, his contract with Perugia was terminated by mutual consent. 

On 26 January 2022, he joined Virton in Belgium.

On 23 May 2022, Vanbaleghem agreed to return to France and signed with Sedan.

References

External links
 Berichonne profile

1996 births
Footballers from Lille
Living people
Association football midfielders
French footballers
Lille OSC players
Les Herbiers VF players
LB Châteauroux players
A.C. Perugia Calcio players
R.E. Virton players
CS Sedan Ardennes players
Ligue 2 players
Championnat National players
Championnat National 2 players
Championnat National 3 players
Challenger Pro League players
Serie C players
Serie B players
French expatriate footballers
Expatriate footballers in Italy
French expatriate sportspeople in Italy
Expatriate footballers in Belgium
French expatriate sportspeople in Belgium